The Urge is an alternative rock band based in St. Louis, Missouri. Their music combines several genres, including hardcore punk, heavy metal, ska, reggae, funk, rock, and rhythm and blues. Consistent touring throughout the 1990s earned the band a reputation for high-energy live performances.

History

Early career (1987–1994)
The Urge was originally formed in 1987 by Webster Groves High School classmates Jeff Herschel (drums) and Karl Grable (bass), and Pat Malecek (guitar) of Saint Louis University High School. The band went through two singers before recruiting Steve Ewing for vocal duties in late 1987. Their first album was released on August 12, 1989, the cassette-only Bust Me Dat Forty, followed a year later by the LP Puttin' the Backbone Back on August 9, which featured the addition of saxophonist Jordan Chalden whom joined the band at the end of 1989.

After trombonist Matt Kwiatkowski was recruited in 1992, the group released Magically Delicious, which also featured contributions from trumpeter Tony Albano. Chalden left the band shortly after to deal with substance abuse problems. Later that year, the group added saxophonist/keyboardist Bill Reiter and trombonist/keyboardist Todd Painter. In early 1993, the band released the LP Fat Babies in the Mix, a live concert album recorded at Mississippi Nights.

After Herschel left the band in May 1994 and Malecek left a few months later to pursue other career paths, guitarist Jerry Jost and drummer John Pessoni, who had previously played together in other bands including Life Without Wayne and The Stand, joined the lineup. Frequent touring with 311 increased the band's fan base.

Success and first breakup (1995–2002)
In 1995 the band independently released Receiving The Gift of Flavor. Regional radio play of songs "Brainless", "All Washed Up", and "Violent Opposition", as well as successful album sales, brought the band to the attention of Epic's Immortal imprint, which reissued the LP in 1996. The band's music video for "All Washed Up" was used as part of a hidden content for the first issue's second disk of PlayStation Underground in 1997.

After constant touring with the likes of labelmates Korn and Incubus, Master of Styles was released in 1998, containing the hit "Jump Right In" (featuring singer Nick Hexum of 311), as well as the singles "Closer" and "Straight to Hell". "Jump Right In" can be heard in an episode of MTV's Daria and MTV's The Real World.

Following the release of Too Much Stereo in mid-2000, and contributing their song "It's My Turn to Fly" to the 2000 animated film Titan A.E., the band toured for nearly a year before calling it quits. In late December 2001, the band went on separate ways due to musical differences.

During their first break-up, frontman Steve Ewing has made several solo records under the name Stevie E. and is currently assisting several growing local St. Louis rock bands including Zamudio, The Dead End, and Lojic. Guitarist Jerry Jost was almost chosen as the replacement guitarist for Limp Bizkit after Wes Borland left the band in 2002. The other members still reside in St. Louis and are involved in several musical projects.

First reunion (2003–2005)
On October 21, 2003, the band announced their reunion with their shows at The Pageant on December 23 and 25. The Urge later on played several reunion shows before they disbanded again in 2005.

Second reunion (2011–present)
On July 15, 2011, The Urge confirmed that they would be reforming to write new music. Their new single "Say Yeah" debuted immediately following the announcement at Pop's live on the radio. Their first show back together was Pointfest 29. During the live radio interview, the band discussed with Donny Fandango that the new music will be entirely new material, and will not be the abandoned album "Escape From Boys Town" from 2001 (which they currently have no plans of resurrecting). The band released their seventh studio album, Galvanized on November 22, 2013. The band performed at The Pageant on November 22, 23 and 29 to promote their album.
In July 2015, the band teamed up with PledgeMusic in a fundraising campaign for their 20th anniversary of their album Receiving The Gift of Flavor. To commemorate the album's anniversary, the band re-recorded the songs live at Webster Groves, MO on August 15, 2015. The album was later released on iTunes on November 21, 2015 
On September 8, 2017, the band released a brand new single titled "How Does It Feel".

On October 1, 2018, Chris Pinkert reported that the St. Louis Blues had partnered with The Urge to create a new goal song for the team. The song, eventually titled "The Blues Have the Urge", was implemented for the start of the 2018–19 NHL season and was played following each Blues goal at home, immediately after organist Jeremy Boyer played the traditional organ rendition of "When The Blues Go Marching In". For home wins, the song is also played immediately following the final horn (replacing Blur's Song 2), followed by an instrumental version as the NHL Three Stars are announced.

Band members
 Current members
 Karl Grable - bass (1987–2001, 2003–05, 2011-present)
 Steve Ewing - lead vocals (1987–2001, 2003–05, 2011-present)
 Matt Kwiatkowski - trombone (1992–2001, 2003–05, 2011-present)
 Bill Reiter - saxophone, keyboards, vocals (1992–2001, 2003–05, 2011-present)
 Jerry Jost - guitar (1994–2001, 2003–05, 2011-present)
 John Pessoni - drums, vocals (1994–2001, 2003–05, 2011-present)

 Former members
 Jeff Herschel - drums (1987–1994)
 Pat Malecek - guitar (1987–1994)
 Jordan Chalden - saxophone (1989-1992)
 Todd Painter - trombone, keyboards (1992–1999)
 Tony Albano - trumpet  (1991-1992)

Timeline

Discography

Studio albums

Other albums

References

 Crone, Thomas Second Set: The Urge brings back the crazy (2012), St. Louis Beacon

External links
 

Musical groups from St. Louis
Musical groups established in 1987